The Ferdowsi Gas Field is one of the NIOC Recent Discoveries, located at approximately 190 kilometers southeast of Bushehr, 85 kilometers off the coast of Iran, in the Persian Gulf.

On 26 December 2007, a contract for development was signed between the National Iranian Oil Company and the Malaysian SKS International Oil & Gas Co.

See also

 World Largest Gas Fields
 Iran Natural Gas Reserves
 South Pars Gas Field
 North Pars
 Golshan Gas Field
 Persian LNG

References

Natural gas fields in Iran
Persian Gulf